"The Seagull" (Welsh: Yr Wylan) is a love poem in 30 lines by the 14th-century Welsh poet Dafydd ap Gwilym, probably written in or around the 1340s.  Dafydd is widely seen as the greatest of the Welsh poets, and this is one of his best-known and best-loved works.

Summary

The poet addresses and praises a seagull flying over the waves, comparing it to, among other things, a gauntlet, a ship at anchor, a sea-lily, and a nun.  He asks it to find a girl whom he compares to Eigr and who can be found on the ramparts of a castle, to intercede with her, and to tell her that the poet cannot live without her.  He loves her for her beauty more than Myrddin or Taliesin ever loved, and unless he wins kind words from her he will die.

Imagery

The academic critic Huw Meirion Edwards considered that "The Seagull"’s imagery goes far beyond anything that had come before it in Welsh poetry, and Anthony Conran wrote that "pictorially it is superb…[it] has the visual completeness, brilliance and unity of a medieval illumination, a picture from a book of hours".  Dafydd wrote several love-messenger poems, and is indeed considered the master of that form.  They follow an established pattern, beginning by addressing the llatai, or messenger, going on to describe it in terms of praise, then asking the llatai to take the poet's message to his lover, and finally in general adding a prayer that the messenger return safely.  But in "The Seagull", as with Dafydd's other bird-poems, the gull is more than just a conventional llatai: the bird's appearance and behaviour are observed closely, while at the same time Dafydd shows, according to the scholar Rachel Bromwich, "an almost mystical reverence" for it.  The image of the seagull's beautiful, white, immaculate purity suggests that of the girl, while the bird's flight embodies the idea of freedom, in contrast with the dominating and enclosing castle.  This castle has not been positively identified, although Aberystwyth and Criccieth have both been suggested.  The girl herself is unusual in two respects, firstly in the paucity of physical detail in Dafydd's description of her as compared with the women in his other love poems, and secondly in that she is a redhead, as very few women in medieval Welsh poetry are.

Poetic art

The seagull is described in what has been called "a guessing game technique" or "riddling", a technique known in Welsh as dyfalu comprising the stringing together of imaginative and hyperbolic similes and metaphors.  Dafydd also uses devices for breaking up syntax known as sangiad and tor ymadrodd.  So, for example:

The translator Idris Bell explained the sense of this as "Have the kindness in courteous wise to give her the message that I shall die unless she will be mine."

References to older poetry

Eigr, with whom Dafydd compares his beloved, was in Welsh tradition the wife of Uther Pendragon and mother of King Arthur.  She is the heroine he most often cites as the archetypical beautiful woman.  The legendary figures of Myrddin and Taliesin are often invoked together in Welsh verse, and in some early poems Myrddin is presented as a lover, though Taliesin was not, making Dafydd's mention of him in this role rather odd.  It has been argued that these two figures are introduced as a tribute to one of the wellsprings of Dafydd's work, the native Welsh poetic tradition, while on the other hand the terms in which he describes his submission to the girl acknowledge one of the other great influences on him, the literature of courtly love, stemming from Provence but by Dafydd's time to be found across Europe.

Adaptations

 Glyn Jones wrote a poem, "Dafydd's Seagull and the West Wind", which gives the seagull's response.
 John Hardy set "The Seagull" as part of a song-cycle called Fflamau Oer: Songs for Jeremy.
 David Vaughan Thomas wrote a musical setting of the poem in 1924 which was published posthumously in 1950.
 Robert Spearing set the poem, together with some lines from Romeo and Juliet, in his cantata for tenor and piano She Solus.

English translations and paraphrases

 
 Bell, David, in   With the Middle Welsh original in parallel text.
   With the Middle Welsh original in parallel text.
  
 Rev. repr. in 
 
 
 
 
 
 
 
 
 Jones, Glyn. 
 Repr. in 
 
 
 Rev. repr. in 
   With the Middle Welsh original in parallel text.

Footnotes

References

External links
 Full text in Middle Welsh at Welsh Wikisource
 The Kenneth Hurlstone Jackson translation
 The Glyn Jones translation
 A reading of the poem in Welsh and English
 A paraphrase of the poem by Giles Watson
 "Yr Wylan" sung to a harp accompaniment

14th-century poems
Birds in popular culture
Love poems
Poetry by Dafydd ap Gwilym